Lasionycta is a genus of moths of the family Noctuidae.

Species
 Lasionycta alpicola Lafontaine & Kononenko, 1988
 Lasionycta anthracina Crabo & Lafontaine, 2009
 Lasionycta benjamini Hill, 1927
 Lasionycta brunnea Crabo & Lafontaine, 2009
 Lasionycta buraetica Kononenko, 1988
 Lasionycta caesia Crabo & Lafontaine, 2009
 Lasionycta calberlai (Staudinger, 1883)
 Lasionycta carolynae Crabo, 2009
 Lasionycta coloradensis (Richards, 1943)
 Lasionycta conjugata (Smith, 1899)
 Lasionycta coracina Crabo & Lafontaine, 2009
 Lasionycta corax Kononenko, 1988
 Lasionycta decreta (Püngeler, 1900)
 Lasionycta discolor (Smith, 1899)
 Lasionycta dolosa (Barnes & Benjamin, 1923)
 Lasionycta draudti (Wagner, 1936)
 Lasionycta fergusoni Crabo & Lafontaine, 2009
 Lasionycta flanda (Smith, 1908)
 Lasionycta frigida Crabo & Lafontaine, 2009
 Lasionycta gelida Crabo & Lafontaine, 2009
 Lasionycta haida Crabo & Lafontaine, 2009
 Lasionycta hampsoni Varga, 1974
 Lasionycta hospita Bang-Haas, 1912
 Lasionycta illima Crabo & Lafontaine, 2009
 Lasionycta imbecilla  (Fabricius, 1794)
 Lasionycta impar (Staudinger, 1870)
 Lasionycta impingens (Walker, 1857)
 Lasionycta lagganata (Barnes & Benjamin, 1924)
 Lasionycta leucocycla (Staudinger, 1857)
 Lasionycta levicula (Püngeler, 1909)
 Lasionycta luteola (Smith, 1893)
 Lasionycta macleani (McDunnough, 1927)
 Lasionycta melanographa Varga, 1973
 Lasionycta mono Crabo & Lafontaine, 2009
 Lasionycta montanoides (Poole, 1989)
 Lasionycta mutilata (Smith, 1898)
 Lasionycta orientalis (Alphéraky, 1882)
 Lasionycta perplexa (Smith, 1888)
 Lasionycta perplexella Crabo & Lafontaine, 2009
 Lasionycta phaea (Hampson, 1905)
 Lasionycta phoca (Möschler, 1864)
 Lasionycta poca (Barnes & Benjamin, 1923)
 ?Lasionycta poliades (Draudt, 1950)
 Lasionycta promulsa (Morrison, 1875)
 Lasionycta proxima (Hübner, [1809])
 Lasionycta pulverea Crabo & Lafontaine, 2009
 Lasionycta quadrilunata (Grote, 1874)
 Lasionycta sasquatch Crabo & Lafontaine, 2009
 Lasionycta secedens (Walker, [1858])
 Lasionycta silacea Crabo & Lafontaine, 2009
 Lasionycta sierra Crabo & Lafontaine, 2009
 Lasionycta skraelingia (Herrich-Schäffer, [1852])
 Lasionycta staudingeri (Aurivillius, 1891)
 Lasionycta subalpina Crabo & Lafontaine, 2009
 Lasionycta subdita (Möschler, 1860)
 Lasionycta subfumosa (Gibson, 1920)
 Lasionycta subfuscula (Grote, 1874)
 Lasionycta taigata Lafontaine, 1988
 Lasionycta uniformis (Smith, 1893)

Lasionycta arietis, Lasionycta insolens, Lasionycta ochracea, Lasionycta sala, Lasionycta wyatti have been transferred to the genus Psammopolia.

References
 Lasionycta at funet.fi
 Natural History Museum Lepidoptera genus database

 
Hadenini
Moth genera